Norberto Aníbal Napolitano (March 10, 1950 – February 25, 2005), popularly known as Pappo, was an Argentine rock musician, guitarist, singer and songwriter. He was and is one of the most influential figures in Argentine music, and in addition to being one of the forerunners of Argentine rock. Besides, he was one of the first to venture into heavy metal in his country and blues of the same.

He is considered by various musicians in his country, by the public and by the specialized press as the best guitarist in the entire history of argentine rock, while B. B. King considered him one of the best guitarists of all time.

He was a member of important Argentine rock bands such as Los Abuelos de la Nada, Engranaje, Los Gatos and Billy Bond y La Pesada del Rock and Roll. He also founded the legendary blues rock band, Pappo's Blues. Another hard rock: Aeroblus in the 1970s, and the historic heavy metal Riff band in the 1980s. He also founded a band in United States called The Widowmakers.

His pseudonym arose from a deformation of an abbreviation of his surname (Napo), which was mutating until it reached the stylized Pappo. Another nickname with which he was popularly known was  Carpo , alluding to the dominance he possessed when moving the carpus of his hand to execute Guitar. Likewise, the popular guitarist B. B. King nicknamed him "The Cheeseman", due to a gift made by Pappo to the American guitarist, consisting of an Argentine cheese and a red wine.

Biography 
Pappo was born in La Paternal, Buenos Aires. Since his youth he showed interest in blues and rock 'n' roll music, his early influences being The Rolling Stones, The Kinks, Freddie King, B.B. King, Jimi Hendrix, Muddy Waters, Eric Clapton, and Manal. During the late 1960s and through the 1970s, he was a pivotal part of the Argentine rock scene. Pappo started playing as an occasional guitarist for Manal but soon joined Los Abuelos de la Nada and later Los Gatos, with whom he recorded two albums in 1969 and 1970. He formed his own band Pappo's Blues in 1970, releasing a first album in 1971 The band was also part of the 1973 rock documentary "Hasta que se ponga el sol", filmed during the third edition of the historic B.A. Rock festival. During the first era of Pappo's Blues in the 1970s, there were constant line-up changes with Pappo being the only permanent member of the band and main songwriter.

Between 1975 and 1980, Pappo lived alternately in England and Argentina. In the United Kingdom he made contact with new genres such as punk rock and the new wave of British heavy metal. He formed the power trio Aeroblus in 1977 with ex-Manal bassist Alejandro Medina and Brazilian drummer Castello Jr. Pappo relocated to Argentina permanently in 1980 and formed the band Riff. In 1990, he appeared as a guest guitarist in Sandra Mihanovich and Celeste Carballo's album Mujer contra mujer. The musician returned with Pappo's Blues in the 1990s, alternating the activity of this group with eventual reunions of Riff. Pappo released a solo album with a classic blues and hard rock sound, Buscando un amor in 2003, which turned out to be his last record.

Pappo died in February 2005 in a motorcycle accident. The Autonomous City of Buenos Aires dedicated a monument in his honour.

Discography 

Pappo's discography encompasses almost four decades, from the late 60s with Los Gatos and Los Abuelos de la Nada until his death in 2005.

 Los Abuelos de la Nada 
Diana divaga / Tema en flu sobre el planeta (1967, single)
La estación (Song recorded in 1968, only released on compilations)

 Los Gatos 

Beat Nº1, 1969 
All songs written by Litto Nebbia
"Sueña y corre"
"Hogar"
"Dónde está, cómo fue"
"El otro yo del Señor Negocios"
"Flores y cartas"
"Lágrimas de María"
"Soy de cualquier lugar"
"Escúchame, alúmbrame"
"Fuera de la ley"

Rock de la mujer perdida, 1970 
All songs written by Litto Nebbia, except where noted.
"Rock de la mujer perdida"
"Requiem para un hombre feliz"
"Los días de Actemio"
"Invasión" (Ciro, Pappo, Alfredo y Oscar Moro).
"Mujer de carbón"
"No fui hecho para esta tierra"
"Por qué bajamos a la ciudad"
"Blues de la calle 23"

 Pappo's Blues 

Pappo's Blues, 1971 
"Algo ha cambiado"
"El viejo"
"Hansen"
"Gris y amarillo"
"Adiós Willy"
"El hombre suburbano"
"Especies"
"Adónde está la libertad"

Pappo's Blues Volumen 2, 1972 
"Tren de las 16"
"Llegará la paz"
"Insoluble"
"Tema 1"
"Desconfío de la vida"
"Pobre Juan"
"Blues para Santa Fe"
"Tumba"

Pappo's Blues Volumen 3, 1972
 Stratocaster Boogie
 Pájaro metálico
 Sucio y desprolijo
 El sur de la ciudad
 Sandwiches de miga
 El brujo y el tiempo
 Trabajando en el ferrocarril
 Caras en el parque
 Siempre es lo mismo nena

Pappo's Blues Volumen 4, 1973 
 Fiesta cervezal
 Gato de la calle negra
 Abelardo el pollo
 Semilla de sésamo
 Con Elvira es otra cosa
 Sol de armónica
 El palacio de la montaña de invierno

Triángulo, 1974 
 Malas compañías
 Nervioso visitante
 Mirese adentro
 Hubo distancias en un curioso baile matinal (parte I)
 Hubo distancias en un curioso baile matinal (parte II)
 El buzo

Pappo's Blues Volumen 6, 1975 
 Slide blues
 Abordo
 Nervioso visitante (parte II)
 El escarabajo
 Los libres pecan por ser libres

Pappo's Blues Volumen 7, 1978 
 El hombre suburbano
 El viejo
 El jugador
 Tema 1
 Abordo
 Gris y amarillo
 Detras de la iglesia

Vol. 8 - Caso cerrado, 1995 
 Tren azul
Ruta 66
Solo en este mundo
Yo me quedo con Lucy
Blues para mi guitarra
Castillos mágicos españoles
Algunos deslices
People Don't Care
Paramount Souffle
Penetieso Blues
P.B.A Boogie
Duendes
Perro en la Vereda
Tomé demasiado

El auto rojo, 1999 
 Cruzando América en un taxi
 No sé inglés
 El auto rojo
 Dos caras
 Cuando dos trenes chocan
 El viento llora a Mary
 Cissy Strut
 Pueblo del norte
 Whisky malo
 Es algo de amor
 La isola
 Todavía sigo en pie
 La sombra maldita
 El reglamento

 Patrulha do Espaço 

Patrulha 85, 1985 
Robot
Mulher fácil
Olho animal
Deus devorador
El Riff

 Solo 
 Nunca lo sabrán (Song recorded in 1969, only released on compilations)

Pappo En Concierto, 1984 (Live) 
"Completamente nervioso"
"Buen tiempo"
"El brujo y el tiempo"
"Triple seis"
"Esto no conduce a ningún lugar"
"La adivina"
"Berkeley"
"Siempre es lo mismo nena"
"Tema solísimo"
"Todo el día me pregunto"
"Duro invierno"
"A varios kilómetros de aquí"

Plan diabólico, 1987 (As "Pappo y Hoy No Es Hoy") 
"Diabólico plan"
"Egipto"
"Mensajero nocturno"
"El hombre de la valija"
"El poder es mejor a peor"
"Tren Azul"
"Gas Oil"
"Corcel de acero"

Pappo & Widowmaker, 1989

"Hammerhead" (Cabeza de martillo) (Song only released as bonus track on "El Riff")
"Capt. Modulator" (Song only released as bonus track on "El Riff")

El Riff, 1990 (Reissue of "Patrulha 85" with bonus tracks) 
El Riff
Ojo animal
Dios devorador
Robot
Mujer fácil
Cabeza de martillo (Pappo & Widowmaker, bonus track)
Captain Modulator (Pappo & Widowmaker, Chilean release bonus track)

Blues Local, 1992 
  Longchamps Boogie
  Mi vieja
  Buscando el tesoro de Borneo
  Saco italiano
  La almeja
  Blues local
  Pequeña ala
  Una casa con diez pinos
  El tropezón
  El hombre oculto
  Dr. Tazo
  Blues del perro
  Dos bajistas
  Nacido bajo un signo malo

Pappo & Deacon Jones, 1993 (Live) 
Fiesta cervezal
El tropezón
Pequeña ala
Siempre es lo mismo, nena
Sube a mi voiture
Blues de Santa Fe
Desconfío
Tren de las 16

Pappo sigue vivo, 1994 (Live) 
 Llegará la paz
 El hombre suburbano
 El hombre de la valija
 El gato de la calle negra
 Triple seis
 Malas compañías
 Tomé demasiado
 Desconfío
 Una casa con diez pinos
 Pájaro metálico
 El viejo
 T-Bone steak
 Blues Got Soul
 Duelo Pappo-Edgar Winter

Pappo y Amigos, 2000 
CD 1
 Fiesta cervezal (Pappo & La Renga)
 Vamos a buscar la luz (Pappo & Alejandro Medina)
 El gato de la calle negra (Pappo's Blues)
 El brujo y el tiempo (Pappo & Almafuerte)
 Siempre es lo mismo, nena (Pappo's Blues)
 El sur de la ciudad (Pappo's Blues & Vicentico)
 Pájaro metálico (Pappo's Blues & Omar Mollo)
 Con Elvira es otra cosa (Pappo & Adrián Otero)
 Solitario Juan (Pappo & Andrés Ciro)
 Triple seis (Pappo & A.N.I.M.A.L.)
 Insoluble (Pappo & Sr. Flavio)
 Blues de Santa Fe (Pappo's Blues & Juanse)
 Mirese adentro (Pappo's Blues & La Mississippi)
 Abelardo el pollo (Pappo's Blues)
 Tema solísimo (Pappo & Alejandro Medina)
 Sandwiches de miga (Pappo's Blues)
 Detrás de la iglesia (Pappo's Blues & Alambre Gonzalez)
 Trabajando en el ferrocarril (Pappo & Antonio Birabent)
 Mi vieja (Pappo & Andrés Calamaro)
 Blues local (Pappo & Viejas Locas)
 El tren de las 16 (Pappo's Blues & Luciano Napolitano)
CD 2
 Sucio y desprolijo (Divididos)
 El viejo (Pappo & La Renga)
 Ruta 66 (Pappo's Blues)
 El hombre suburbano (Pappo & Viejas Locas)
 La adivina (Pappo & Omar Mollo)
 Algo ha cambiado (Pappo & Andrés Ciro)
 Desconfío (Pappo & Vicentico)
 Llegará la paz (Pappo & Almafuerte)
 Malas compañías (Pappo's Blues)
 Slide blues (Pappo & Adrián Otero)
 Completamente nervioso (Pappo's Blues & Ricardo Iorio)
 Caras en el parque (Pappo & Alfredo Toth)
 Gris y amarillo (Pappo's Blues y La Mississippi)
 Tomé demásiado (Pappo's Blues y Juanse)
 Tren azul (Pappo's Blues, Vitico & Juan Haymes)
 Adónde está la libertad (Pappo's Blues & Moris)
 Hay tiempo para elegir (Pappo & Sr. Flavio)
 Cabeza de martillo (Pappo & A.N.I.M.A.L.)
 Vine cruzando el mar (Pappo's Blues)
 Nunca lo sabrán (Andrés Calamaro)

Buscando un amor, 2003 
 Ella es un ángel
 Buscando un amor
 Rock and roll y fiebre
 Juntos a la par
 Mejor que vos
 Yo te amo más
 Banquero blues
 Aquel gato
 La barca
 En los bares
 Descortés
 Botas sucias
 Trabajo forzado
 Katmandú
 Tributo a B.B. King
 Trouble No More
 Thrill Is Gone
 Little Red Rooster
 Killin' Floor
 Rock Me Baby

 Aeroblus 

Aeroblus, 1977 
 Vamos a buscar la luz
 Completamente nervioso
 Tema solísimo
 Arboles difusores
 Vendríamos a buscar
 Aire en movimiento
 Vine cruzando el mar
 Nada estoy sabiendo
 Sofisticuatro
 Buen tiempo

References

External links 

 Biography Rock.com.ar 
 

1950 births
2005 deaths
Argentine guitarists
Argentine male guitarists
Argentine heavy metal musicians
Argentine people of Italian descent
Electric blues musicians
People from Buenos Aires
Road incident deaths in Argentina
Motorcycle road incident deaths
20th-century guitarists
20th-century male musicians